Ester Palmesino (7 May 1927 – 20 March 2016) was an Italian high jumper.

Career
Palmesino was four-times Italian champion in high jump, winner and finalist of international competitions.

Achievements

References 
Martini, Marco, Ludovico Perricone (2000). "A century of champions stories. Athletics in Piedmont, from its origins in Sydney 2000", Omega Arte
A.S.A.I. Bruno Bonomelli, Italian Athletics Historical Archive
La Stampa, Historical Archive: La Stampa 13/07/1942, n. 166, page 2. Stampa Sera 28/07/1947 - n. 88 page 4. Stampa Sera 16/09/1949 - n. 221 page 4. Stampa Sera 25/05/1951 - n. 123 page 5. Stampa Sera 04/06/1951 - n. 131 page 4. Stampa Sera 18/06/1951 - n. 143 page 4. Stampa Sera 30/07/1951 - n. 179 page 4. Stampa Sera 13/08/1951 - n. 191 page 4. Stampa Sera 24/09/1951 - n. 226 page 4. La Stampa 22/12/1951 - n. 302 page 4. La Stampa 23/12/1951 - n. 303 page 4. Stampa Sera 05/05/1952 - n. 105 page 4. Stampa Sera 22/09/1952 - n. 224 page 5. Stampa Sera 06/10/1952 - n. 236 page 6. La Stampa 17/10/1952 - n. 246 page 5. La Stampa 18/10/1952 - n. 247 page 4. Stampa Sera 22/06/1953 - n. 147 page 7. Stampa Sera 04/07/1953 - n. 158 page 5. Stampa Sera 10/09/1953 - n. 215 page 5. Stampa Sera 21/09/1953 - n. 223 page 4. Stampa Sera 29/05/1954 - n. 126 page 5. Stampa Sera 10/07/1954 - n. 162 page 4. Stampa Sera 12/07/1954 - n. 163 page 5. Stampa Sera 30/09/1954 - n. 232 page 5. La Stampa 12/06/1955 - n. 139 page 4. Stampa Sera 11/07/1955 - n. 163 page 4. Stampa Sera 18/07/1955 - n. 169 page 5. La Stampa 08/05/1997 - n. 125 page 40. 
Corriere della Sera Historical Archive: Corriere della Sera 28-29/07/1947. Corriere della Sera 09/08/1947. Corriere della Sera 10/08/1947. Corriere della Sera 26-27/06/1948. Corriere della Sera 22-23/09/1948. Corriere della Sera 30-31/07/1949. Corriere della Sera20-21/09/1949. Corriere della Sera 28-29/06/1950. Corriere della Sera 03-04/08/1950. Corriere della Sera 19-20/09/1950. Corriere della Sera 22/09/1950. Corriere della Sera 02/08/1951. Corriere della Sera 21-22/09/1951. Corriere della Sera 22/06/1952. Corriere della Sera 16-17/10/1952. Corriere della Sera 17-18/10/1952. Corriere della Sera 06-07/05/1953. Corriere della Sera 20-21/06/1953. Corriere della Sera 22-23/06/1953. Corriere della Sera 04-05/07/1953.
Telecom Italia Historical Archive, company newspaper "Elettrosip"
RAI Rai Radiotelevisione Italiana, Rai Teche and Bibliomediateca Rai Dino Villani. Video - National catalogue, years 1953/1954.

External links
Italian Athletics Championships – Women. All italian champions – 1923–2013. Sportolimpico.it

1927 births
2016 deaths
Italian female high jumpers
People from Asti
Sportspeople from the Province of Asti